Douglas Wright (born December 20, 1962) is an American playwright, librettist, and screenwriter. He received the Pulitzer Prize for Drama and the Tony Award for Best Play in 2004 for his play I Am My Own Wife. He also wrote the books to the Broadway musicals
Grey Gardens in 2004, The Little Mermaid in 2007,  Hands on a Hard Body in 2012, and War Paint in 2017. His play Good Night, Oscar will make its Broadway debut in 2023.

Early years
Wright was born in Dallas, Texas. He attended and graduated from Highland Park High School, in a suburb of Dallas, Texas, where he excelled in the theater department and was President of the Thespian Club in 1981. He earned his bachelor's degree from Yale University in 1985. He earned his Master of Fine Arts from New York University. He is a member of the Dramatists Guild and serves on the boards of Yaddo and New York Theatre Workshop.  He is a recipient of the William L. Bradley Fellowship at Yale University, the Charles MacArthur Fellowship at the Eugene O'Neill Theater Center, an HBO Fellowship in playwriting and the Alfred Hodder Fellowship at Princeton University.

Career

Wright's play Quills premiered at Washington, D.C.'s Woolly Mammoth Theatre Company in 1995 and subsequently had its debut Off-Broadway at New York Theatre Workshop.  The play recounts the imagined final days in the life of the Marquis de Sade. Quills garnered the 1995 Joseph Kesselring Prize for Best New American Play from the National Arts Club and, for Wright, a 1996 Village Voice Obie Award for Outstanding Achievement in Playwriting.  In 2000, Wright wrote the screenplay for the film version of Quills which starred Geoffrey Rush, Kate Winslet, Joaquin Phoenix, and Michael Caine.

Wright's I Am My Own Wife was produced Off-Broadway by Playwrights Horizons in 2003. It transferred to Broadway where it won the Tony Award for Best Play, as well as the Pulitzer Prize for Drama.  The subject of this one-person play, which starred Jefferson Mays, is the German transvestite Charlotte von Mahlsdorf. With his play I Am My Own Wife, Wright tied in with the film I Am My Own Woman by avant-garde director Rosa von Praunheim (1992).

In 2006, Wright wrote the book for Grey Gardens, starring Christine Ebersole and Mary Louise Wilson. The musical is based on the Maysles brothers' 1975 film documentary of the same title about Edith Ewing Bouvier Beale ("Big Edie") and her daughter Edith Bouvier Beale ("Little Edie"), Jacqueline Kennedy Onassis's aunt and cousin.  He adapted the Disney film The Little Mermaid for the Broadway musical, which opened in 2007.

In 2009, he was commissioned by the La Jolla Playhouse to adapt and direct Creditors by August Strindberg. In another La Jolla commission, he wrote the book for the musical Hands on a Hardbody, with the score by Amanda Green and Trey Anastasio. The musical had a brief run on Broadway in March and April 2013 after premiering at the La Jolla Playhouse in 2012.

He wrote the book for a musical, War Paint, about Helena Rubinstein and Elizabeth Arden. The music is by Scott Frankel and the lyrics by Michael Korie. War Paint premiered at the Goodman Theatre, Chicago, from June 28 to August 14, 2016, with stars Patti LuPone as Helena Rubinstein and Christine Ebersole as Elizabeth Arden. It ran on Broadway in 2017.  The musical received four Tony Award nominations for Ebersole, LuPone, for its set design and costume design.

For television, Wright worked on four pilots for producer Norman Lear and teleplays for Hallmark Entertainment and HBO.
In film, Wright’s credits include screenplays for Fine Line Features, Fox Searchlight, and DreamWorks SKG.

As an ardent supporter for writers' rights in the theatre industry, he is a member of the Dramatists Guild of America and was formerly the elected president of the non-profit organization, succeeded in 2021 by Amanda Green (the first woman to hold the role in the Guild's history). Wright also serves on the board of New York Theatre Workshop.

He is a recipient of the William L. Bradley Fellowship at Yale University, the Charles MacArthur Fellowship at the Eugene O'Neill Theater Center, an HBO Fellowship in playwriting and the Alfred Hodder Fellowship at Princeton University. In 2010 he was named a United States Artists Fellow.

Personal life
Wright lives in New York City with his husband, singer/songwriter David Clement.

Work

Theatre

Film and television

Awards and honors

References

External links

 
 
 
 
 Production: Grey Gardens Working in the Theatre video by the American Theatre Wing, November 2006

1962 births
Living people
20th-century American dramatists and playwrights
20th-century American male writers
21st-century American dramatists and playwrights
21st-century American male writers
American gay writers
American male dramatists and playwrights
Lambda Literary Award for Drama winners
American LGBT dramatists and playwrights
Place of birth missing (living people)
Pulitzer Prize for Drama winners
Tisch School of the Arts alumni
Yale University alumni